Aislinn González Michel (born 18 March 1987), better known as Aislinn Derbez, is a Mexican actress.

Early life and career
Aislinn González Michel is the daughter of actors Eugenio Derbez and Gabriela Michel, who were married from 1986 to 1987. Derbez began her career as a model at age 15. She studied visual arts at the School of Visual Arts and acting at the Actors Studio, both in New York City.

Modeling
She has been on the cover page of several magazines.

Personal life
Actors Vadhir Derbez and José Eduardo Derbez are her paternal half-brothers. She has one more half-sister on her father's side, Aitana (born in 2014), from her father's marriage to Alessandra Rosaldo. On her mother's side, she has two sisters. Her paternal grandmother is the actress Silvia Derbez.

Derbez started dating Mauricio Ochmann after filming A La Mala in 2014; the couple married in 2016. On 27 February 2018 she gave birth to their daughter, named Kailani Ochmann. The couple split and divorced in 2020.

Filmography

Films

Television

References

External links
 
 Web Site
 Biography on Televisa.com

1987 births
Living people
Actresses from Mexico City
Mexican film actresses
Mexican stage actresses
Mexican telenovela actresses
Mexican television actresses
Mexican female models
Mexican people of French descent